is a city located in south central Fukuoka Prefecture, Japan, on Kyūshū Island.

The modern city of Asakura was established on March 20, 2006, from the merger of the former town of Asakura (from Asakura District), absorbing the city of Amagi, and the town of Haki (also from Asakura District).

As of January 31, 2011, the city has an estimated population of 57,488 and a population density of 233 persons per km2. The total area is 246.73 km2.

Geography
Asakura is located about 40 km southeast of Fukuoka and about 20 km northeast of Kurume.

Climate
Asakura has a humid subtropical climate (Köppen: Cfa).

Adjoining municipalities
Fukuoka Prefecture
Chikuzen
Kama
Kurume
Tachiarai
Tōhō
Ukiha
Ōita Prefecture
Hita

Demographics
Per Japanese census data, the population of Asakura in 2020 is 50,273 people. Asakura has been conducting censuses since 1920.

History
The imperial court moved to the Tachibana no Hironiwa Palace, where it stayed from May until July 661.
October, 1876 - Outbreak of the Akizuki Rebellion
April 1, 1889 - The modern municipal system is established. The current city region is occupied by one town, Amagi; and 18 villages: Akizuki, Asakura, Haki, Hinashiro, Fukuda, Fukunari, Kamiakizuki, Kanagawa, Takagi, Kugumiya, Mada, Masue, Minagi, Miyano, Ōba, Shiwa, Tateishi and Yasukawa.
December 27, 1893 - Akizuki was elevated to town status.
June 15, 1909 - Fukunari and Ōba were merged to create Daifuku Village.
April 17, 1939 - Haki was elevated to town status.
April 1, 1951 - Kugumiya, Masue and Shiwa were merged into Haki Town.
April 1, 1954 - Amagi, Akizuki, Fukuda, Hinashiro, Kamiakizuki, Kanagawa, Mada, Minagi, Tateishi and Yasukawa were all merged to create Amagi City.
March 10, 1955 - Takagi was merged into Amagi City.
March 31, 1955 - Daifuku and Miyano were merged into Asakura Village.
April 1, 1962 - Asakura was elevated to town status.
March 20, 2006 - Amagi, Asakura and Haki were merged to create Asakura City.

Education

Prefectural senior high schools
Asakura Kōyō Senior High School
Asakura Higashi Senior High School
Asakura Senior High School

Municipal junior high schools
Amagi Junior High School
Akizuki Junior High School
Haki Junior High School
Hiramatsu Junior High School
Jūmonji Junior High School
Nanryō Junior High School

Municipal elementary schools
Amagi Elementary School
Asakura Higashi Elementary School
Akizuki Elementary School
Daifuku Elementary School
Fukuda Elementary School
Haki Elementary School
Hinashiro Elementary School
Kanagawa Elementary School
Kugumiya Elementary School
Mada Elementary School
Masue Elementary School
Minagi Elementary School
Shiwa Elementary School
Tateishi Elementary School

Transportation

Air
The closest airport is Fukuoka Airport.

Rail
Amagi Railway
Amagi Line
Amagi Station
Nishitetsu
Amagi Line
Amagi Station - Mada Station - Kamiura Station

Road
Expressways
Ōita Expressway
Amagi Interchange - Asakura Interchange - Yamada Service Area - Haki Interchange
National highways:
Route 322
Route 386
Harazuru Roadside Station
Route 500
Main prefectural roads: 
Mada-Tonta Route 8
Tosu-Asakura Route 14
Amagi-Tanushimaru Route 33
Yame-Kawara Route 52
Keisenshimo-Akizuki Route 66
Asakura-Koishiwara Route 79
Amagi-Asakura-Tanushimaru Route 80

Scenic and historic places

Akizuki 
Akizuki Castle Ruins
Asakura Three Waterwheels
Eso Hachiman Shrine
Harazuru Onsen
Hiratukakawazoe Ruins 
Kakurega Forest

Festivals and events
Dorouchi Festival
Oshiroi Festival

Notable people
 Michiko Kichise – actress and model

References

External links

 Asakura City official website 

 
Cities in Fukuoka Prefecture